The 22nd San Diego Film Critics Society Awards were announced on December 11, 2017.

Winners and nominees

Best Film
Get Out
Call Me by Your Name
Dunkirk
Lady Bird
Three Billboards Outside Ebbing, Missouri

Best Director
Greta Gerwig – Lady Bird
Guillermo del Toro – The Shape of Water
Martin McDonagh – Three Billboards Outside Ebbing, Missouri
Christopher Nolan – Dunkirk
Jordan Peele – Get Out

Best Male Actor
James McAvoy – Split
Timothée Chalamet – Call Me by Your Name
James Franco – The Disaster Artist
Gary Oldman – Darkest Hour
Robert Pattinson – Good Time

Best Female Actor
Sally Hawkins – Maudie
Sally Hawkins – The Shape of Water
Frances McDormand – Three Billboards Outside Ebbing, Missouri
Margot Robbie – I, Tonya
Saoirse Ronan – Lady Bird

Best Male Supporting Actor
Sam Rockwell – Three Billboards Outside Ebbing, Missouri
Willem Dafoe – The Florida Project
Woody Harrelson – Three Billboards Outside Ebbing, Missouri
Ethan Hawke – Maudie
Oscar Isaac – Suburbicon

Best Female Supporting Actor
Allison Janney – I, Tonya (TIE) 
Laurie Metcalf – Lady Bird (TIE)
Holly Hunter – The Big Sick
Catherine Keener – Get Out
Bria Vinaite – The Florida Project

Best Comedic Performance
Daniel Craig – Logan Lucky
James Franco – The Disaster Artist
Lil Rel Howery – Get Out
Ezra Miller – Justice League
Ray Romano – The Big Sick

Best Original Screenplay
Jordan Peele – Get Out
Emily V. Gordon and Kumail Nanjiani – The Big Sick
Greta Gerwig – Lady Bird
Martin McDonagh – Three Billboards Outside Ebbing, Missouri
Christopher Nolan – Dunkirk

Best Adapted Screenplay
Scott Neustadter and Michael H. Weber – The Disaster Artist
Sofia Coppola – The Beguiled
James Gray – The Lost City of Z
James Ivory – Call Me by Your Name
Virgil Williams and Dee Rees – Mudbound

Best Animated Film
My Life as a Zucchini
The Boss Baby
Coco
Loving Vincent
My Entire High School Sinking Into the Sea

Best Documentary
Jane
Ex Libris: The New York Public Library
Faces Places
Last Men in Aleppo
The Work

Best Foreign Language Film
Thelma
BPM (Beats per Minute)
Faces Places
The Other Side of Hope
The Square

Best Cinematography
Hoyte van Hoytema – Dunkirk
Roger Deakins – Blade Runner 2049
Darius Khondji – The Lost City of Z
Dan Laustsen – The Shape of Water
Ben Richardson – Wind River

Best Costume Design
Mark Bridges – Phantom Thread (TIE) 
Jacqueline Durran – Beauty and the Beast (TIE)
Stacey Battat – The Beguiled
Jenny Eagan – Hostiles
Sonia Grande – The Lost City of Z
Luis Sequeira – The Shape of Water

Best Editing
Paul Machliss and Jonathan Amos – Baby Driver
Michael Kahn and Sarah Broshar – The Post
Jon Gregory – Three Billboards Outside Ebbing, Missouri
Lee Smith – Dunkirk
Sidney Wolinsky – The Shape of Water

Best Production Design
Paul D. Austerberry – The Shape of Water
Nathan Crowley – Dunkirk
Sarah Greenwood – Beauty and the Beast
Alessandra Querzola and Dennis Gassner – Blade Runner 2049
Anne Ross – The Beguiled

Best Visual Effects
War for the Planet of the Apes
Beauty and the Beast
Blade Runner 2049
Dunkirk
The Shape of Water

Best Use of Music in a Film
Baby Driver
Beauty and the Beast
Call Me by Your Name
Dunkirk
The Shape of Water

Breakthrough Artist
Timothée Chalamet
Greta Gerwig
Barry Keoghan
Sophia Lillis
Jordan Peele
Brooklynn Prince

Best Ensemble
Mudbound
Get Out
Lady Bird
The Post
Three Billboards Outside Ebbing, Missouri

Best Body of Work
Michael Stuhlbarg for Call Me by Your Name, The Post, and The Shape of Water

References

External links
 Official Site

2017
2017 film awards
2017 in American cinema